Mordellistena trifasciata is a species of beetle in the genus Mordellistena of the family Mordellidae. It was described by Say in 1824.

References

External links
Coleoptera. BugGuide.

Beetles described in 1824
trifasciata